The Philadelphia Transportation Company (PTC) was the main public transit operator in Philadelphia, Pennsylvania, from 1940 to 1968.  A private company, PTC was the successor to the Philadelphia Rapid Transit Company (PRT), in operation since 1902, and was the immediate predecessor of the Southeastern Pennsylvania Transportation Authority (SEPTA).

History
PTC was established on January 1, 1940, by the merger of the PRT and several smaller, then-independent transit companies operating in and near the city. It operated a citywide system of bus, trolley, and trackless trolley routes, the Market–Frankford Line (subway-elevated rail), the Broad Street Line (subway), and the Delaware River Bridge Line (subway-elevated rail to City Hall, Camden, New Jersey, and now part of the PATCO Speedline) which became SEPTA's City Transit Division.  PTC operated the rapid transit lines in urban Philadelphia – principally the Market–Frankford Line and Broad Street Line – leasing their fixed infrastructure from the City of Philadelphia. Most suburban transit lines were operated by other private companies, including the Philadelphia Suburban Transportation Company, known as Red Arrow (trolley lines), the Southern Penn Bus Company (bus lines), and the Philadelphia & Western Railroad (Norristown and Strafford interurban lines). PTC's network also included the Philadelphia trolleybus system, which was much smaller, along with numerous bus lines.

Among PTC's first actions was to begin replacing its aging fleet of vehicles. In 1940, the company placed orders for 130 PCC streetcars, 50 trackless trolleys, and 53 motor buses.

In 1944, during the Second World War, white PTC workers engaged in a wildcat strike aimed at preventing the promotion of African American employees to conductors and other positions. The strike ended when President Franklin D. Roosevelt ordered troops into the city to run the cars.

In 1955, majority control of PTC was acquired by the National City Lines holding company, which had a record of replacing trolleys with buses in other cities. NCL followed suit in Philadelphia. In 1954, the PTC trolley system included 45 lines, using more than 1,500 trolley cars.  Between 1954 and 1958, three-fourths of the trolley lines were abandoned, and 984 trolley cars had been scrapped, replaced by 1,000 new buses.

The Southeastern Pennsylvania Transportation Authority (SEPTA) was established in 1964, as part of efforts by the Pennsylvania legislature to coordinate government subsidies to various transit and railroad companies in southeastern Pennsylvania. The provision of public transit service was becoming increasingly unprofitable in the 1950s and 1960s, and cities across the country were municipalizing their transit systems or creating regional public transit authorities.  SEPTA acquired the Philadelphia Transportation Company in 1968, taking possession of PTC at noon on September 30, 1968.  The total price paid to PTC stockholders for the purchase was $47.9 million (equivalent to $ million in ).

See also
 Transportation in Philadelphia

References

Further reading
 Wolfinger, James. Running the Rails: Capital and Labor in the Philadelphia Transit Industry (Cornell University Press, 2016). xii, 292 pp. .

1940 establishments in Pennsylvania
1968 disestablishments in Pennsylvania
History of Philadelphia
Bus transportation in Pennsylvania
Defunct public transport operators in the United States
Rapid transit in Pennsylvania
Passenger rail transportation in Pennsylvania
Transportation in Philadelphia
Tram, urban railway and trolley companies